The Ambarnaya is a river in Siberia which flows in a northerly direction into Lake Pyasino. On leaving Lake Pyasino, the waters emerge as the river Pyasina. It shares a common delta with the river Norilskaya.

The river is fed by rain and meltwater.  It is shallow and its bed consists of glacial moraine – gravel and pebbles. It is heavily polluted by the mining industry of Norilsk, namely Nornickel, so fishing is no longer possible.

Diesel spill 

In May 2020, 20,000 tonnes of diesel fuel spilt into the river from a power plant. With a  stretch of river seriously affected, Russia's president, Vladimir Putin, declared a state of emergency.

References

Rivers of Krasnoyarsk Krai